The members of the 37th General Assembly of Newfoundland were elected in the Newfoundland general election held in September 1975. The general assembly sat from November 19, 1975 to May 25, 1979.

The Progressive Conservative Party led by Frank Moores formed the government.

Gerald Ottenheimer served as speaker.

There were four sessions of the 37th General Assembly:

Gordon Arnaud Winter served as lieutenant governor of Newfoundland.

Members of the Assembly 
The following members were elected to the assembly in 1975:

Notes:

By-elections 
By-elections were held to replace members for various reasons:

Notes:

References 

Terms of the General Assembly of Newfoundland and Labrador